The 2014 Clarkson Cup is a women's ice hockey tournament that was contested in Markham, Ontario to determine the champion of the Canadian Women's Hockey League from March 19 to March 22, 2014. The Toronto Furies defeated the Boston Blades by a 1-0 tally in overtime to claim their first title. The tournament was played at Markham Centennial Centre. With the victory, Natalie Spooner became the first woman in hockey history to claim the gold medal in the Winter Games and the Clarkson Cup in the same year.

Round robin
March 21: In Toronto's shootout victory against Montreal, Natalie Spooner scored the winning goal of the shootout. With Boston prevailing by a 6-2 tally against Calgary later that day, Hilary Knight scored a tournament-high four goals in one game.

Standings

Scoring leaders

Furies championship roster

Awards and honours
Most Valuable Player, Christina Kessler, Toronto Furies
First Star of the Game, Britni Smith, Toronto Furies
Second Star of the Game, Christina Kessler, Toronto Furies
Third Star of the Game, Brittany Ott, Boston Blades

References

Clarkson Cup
2014